"Tucker's Town" is a song by American rock group Hootie & the Blowfish. It was released on June 25, 1996, as the second single from their second album, Fairweather Johnson (1996). In the United States, it peaked at number 38 on the Billboard Hot 100 (their last Hot 100 entry to date), number 24 on the Billboard Adult Contemporary chart and number 29 on the Billboard Mainstream Rock chart. Outside the US, "Tucker's Town" reached number two in Canada—ending 1996 as the country's 25th-most-successful single—and number 20 in Iceland.

Content
The song is named for the village of Tucker's Town, Bermuda, the mostly black, working-class residents of which (including the future members of The Talbot Brothers band) were compelled to sell their land in the 1920s to make way for a hotel and golf club, and an enclave where foreign millionaires and billionaires are permitted to own homes (Bermuda, on the same latitude as South Carolina, though the nearest landfall is Cape Hatteras in North Carolina, and from which Carolina Colony was colonised under William Sayle in 1670, was a frequent haunt of the South Carolinian band).

Music video
The music video was directed by Greg Masuak.

Track listings

US CD and cassette single
 "Tucker's Town" – 3:46
 "Araby" – 2:51

US 7-inch single
A. "Tucker's Town" – 3:46
B. "Araby" – 2:51

German and Australian CD single
 "Tucker's Town" – 3:46
 "Araby" – 2:51
 "Not Even the Trees" (live)

UK CD single
 "Tucker's Town"
 "Araby"
 "Not Even the Trees" (live)
 "Hannah Jane" (live)

Charts

Weekly charts

Year-end charts

Release history

References

1996 singles
1996 songs
Atlantic Records singles
Hootie & the Blowfish songs
Songs written by Darius Rucker
Songs written by Jim Sonefeld
Songs written by Mark Bryan